Maximiliano Medina (born 18 February 2002) is an Argentine footballer currently playing as a forward for Club Atlético Fénix of the Primera B Metropolitana.

Club career
Born in José C. Paz, Buenos Aires, Medina began his career with Renacer at the age of ten. He had been kicked out of school in his freshman year for being too lazy, as he did not like to get up early in the morning, and was solely playing football. A friend who was playing for Fénix told him that Fénix were looking for forwards, and invited him to try-out at the club.

He joined Fénix in 2015, signing a professional contract with the club the following year. Less than a week after signing professional terms, he made his professional debut, coming on as a substitute for Brian Miranda in a 2–2 draw against Barracas Central. In doing so, he became the youngest player to play in the Primera B Metropolitana, and the second in Argentine football history, behind Darío Roa.

Personal life
A life-long Boca Juniors fan, Medina is an admirer of Juan Román Riquelme.

Career statistics

Club

Notes

References

2002 births
Living people
People from José C. Paz Partido
Sportspeople from Buenos Aires Province
Argentine footballers
Association football forwards
Primera B Metropolitana players
Club Atlético Fénix players